General elections were held in Liechtenstein on 5 February 1922, with a second round on 16 February. They were the first elections held under the 1921 constitution, which resulted in some changes to the electoral system. The result was a victory for the opposition Christian-Social People's Party, which won 11 of the 15 seats.

Electoral system
Under the new constitution the three seats in the Landtag appointed by the Prince were abolished. The number of seats in Oberland was increased from seven to nine, and in Unterland from five to six. The voting age was lowered from 24 to 21, although women were still not allowed to vote.

Results

By electoral district

First round

Second round

References

Liechtenstein
1922 in Liechtenstein
Elections in Liechtenstein
February 1922 events
Election and referendum articles with incomplete results